The 1970 Australian Touring Car Championship was a CAMS-sanctioned motor racing title for drivers of Group C Improved Production Touring Cars and Group E Series Production Touring Cars. The title, which was the 11th Australian Touring Car Championship, began at Calder Park Raceway on 22 March 1970 and ended at Symmons Plains Raceway on 15 November after seven heats.

The 1970 ATCC saw Norm Beechey drive his Holden Monaro HT GTS350 to victory over the Porsche 911S of teammate Jim McKeown. Finishing in third and fourth place were the Ford Mustangs of Bob Jane and four-time defending champion Ian Geoghegan.

Allan Moffat's victory in the opening round at Calder Park created history as the Canadian became the first non-Australian born driver to win an ATCC race. It was the first of an eventual 32 ATCC round wins for Moffat before his final win in Round 3 of the 1984 championship at Wanneroo Park.

Drivers 
The following drivers competed in the 1970 championship. The list is not exhaustive.

Calendar 
The championship was contested over a series of seven heats.

Race summaries

Calder 
Allan Moffat took pole position for the opening round of the championship ahead of Ian Geoghegan and Bob Jane. Geoghegan challenged Moffat for the lead at the first corner but Moffat held the position. Norm Beechey, starting down the order, made his way into fourth place on the first lap before passing both Jane and Geoghegan at the beginning of lap 2. He eventually passed Moffat for the lead before making slight contact with a lapped car, forcing him to pull over to the side of the track and pull the guard off of his front tyre.

Jane had already made a pit stop and Geoghegan lost a rear wheel while Beechey was stopped, leaving Moffat with a sizeable lead. Meanwhile, the Porsches of Brian Foley and Jim McKeown were battling for second place. Beechey had enough pace to catch Moffat and retake the lead on lap 33 before he had to pit to change a front tyre. Moffat cruised to an easy victory from there, with Foley finishing in second place ahead of McKeown, Jane, Bob Brown and Bill Fanning. Beechey returned to the track with three laps left and set a new lap record of 47.7 seconds.

Bathurst 
Ian Geoghegan took pole position with a time of 2:29.9, 1.4 seconds clear of Bob Jane. Allan Moffat completed the front row while Norm Beechey and Brian Foley started on the second row ahead of Jim McKeown and Chris Brauer. Beechey used the straight-line speed of his Holden Monaro to take the lead going up Mountain Straight. After dropping to seventh off the line, Moffat made his way back up to third behind Beechey and Geoghegan during the first lap before both Geoghegan and Moffat passed Beechey going down Conrod Straight. Geoghegan and Moffat pulled away from the rest of the field over the next two laps, while Beechey began to suffer with a misfire. On lap 4 Moffat slowed with a spark plug problem which eventually led to his retirement, giving Geoghegan a break over Beechey and Jane who were battling hard for second place. Nick Petrilli also retired when a piston let go. Jane spun at Forrest's Elbow a few laps later, taking the pressure off of Beechey.

Geoghegan was running the race on worn tyres, as his supplier Firestone did not have new tyres available. As a result, Beechey was able to easily reduce Geoghegan's lead in the second half of the race. At the same time, Phil Barnes began slowing up in his Morris Cooper S, allowing Peter Manton, Bob Holden and Roy Griffiths past. Beechey took the lead going into Murray's Corner on lap 18 and pulled away to take victory. Geoghegan held on for second place while Jane finished third despite his spin. The Porsches of McKeown and Foley finished fourth and fifth respectively while Brauer was the final point-scorer in sixth.

Sandown 
Allan Moffat took his second pole position of the season at Sandown, with Norm Beechey qualifying on the front row ahead of Ian Geoghegan, Bob Jane and Jim McKeown. Beechey took the lead at the start and led all the way to the finish, setting a new lap record in the process. Moffat held second place over Geoghegan until lap 25 when he began having engine dramas, allowing Geoghegan to pass. Jane battled with the Porsches of McKeown and Brian Foley early on before McKeown retired on lap 15, while Foley made contact with a fence and allowed Jane to take fourth place. Foley recovered to finish fifth ahead of Graham Ritter's Ford Escort.

Mallala 
Brian Foley took pole position at the Mallala round, giving Porsche its first pole position in the championship. Jim McKeown and Allan Moffat started the race with wet tyres after rain fell during the morning of the race. Moffat built an early lead before the track started to dry out, which led to the retirement of McKeown due to overheating tyres. Norm Beechey moved into second place and was catching Moffat when his clutch started to slip, allowing Ian Geoghegan and Foley to pass. Moffat's clutch then failed, gifting the lead to Geoghegan. Foley experienced a change in handling which was found to be caused by a broken roll-bar bracket when he made a pit stop. This allowed Beechey to take second place behind Geoghegan while Foley would still manage to finish third. Bill Brown finished fourth ahead of Bob Jane and Peter Manton.

Warwick Farm 
Allan Moffat again qualified on pole position for the fifth round of the championship at Warwick Farm. However, he spun at the first corner and was collected by Ian Geoghegan, while Brian Foley and Bill Brown were also caught up in the incident. Moffat, Geoghegan and Foley all retired from the race while Brown was able to continue. Jim McKeown, after making a good start, had missed the accident and Norm Beechey had moved up to second place. Beechey lost a rear wheel, giving second place to Bob Jane and allowing Brown on to the podium. McKeown took victory, Porsche's first in the championship, ahead of Jane, Brown, Phil Barnes, Chris Brauer and John Humphrey. The victory brought McKeown into championship contention, eight points behind Beechey and five behind Geoghegan with eighteen points still on offer.

Lakeside 
The Lakeside event was marred by a pair of bad accidents. One of the support races saw one driver killed and another seriously injured. Chris Brauer then suffered career-ending injuries in the touring car championship race. Allan Moffat made a poor start from pole position which resulted in Bob Jane and Brian Foley squeezing together. Jane was then pushed into Brauer's car, which left the circuit and slammed into the end of an armco barrier. The race continued with yellow flags at the first corner. Moffat was black flagged for attempting to pass in the yellow flag zone. Ian Geoghegan led the race until lap 7 when he retired with engine problems. Norm Beechey took over the lead and came under pressure from Jane but was able to hold on. Beechey and Jane remained in first and second until the end of the race with Jim McKeown completing the podium. Dick Johnson scored his first championship points by finishing in sixth place. Beechey's victory was enough to secure the title with one race remaining.

Symmons Plains 
Allan Moffat took his fifth pole position of the season, driving his new Ford XW Falcon GTHO Phase II, dubbed the "Super Falcon". Along with Norm Beechey, however, Moffat did not start the race after both drivers blew their engines in practice. The race was held in wet conditions and second-fastest qualifier Jim McKeown took the lead at the start, while Bob Jane lost traction off the start and lost a place to Bryan Thomson. The wet conditions suited McKeown's Porsche and he took a one-lap victory over Thomson with Jane a further lap back in third. The result saw McKeown pass Jane for second place in the championship.

Championship standings

Points system 
Points were awarded as follows to the top six finishers in each heat.

Championship points

References

External links 
 1970 Australian touring car racing images

Australian Touring Car Championship seasons
Touring Cars